Patna Junction (station code PNBE) is a major railway station in the capital city of Patna in the Indian state of Bihar. It is the main railway station serving Patna. It falls under the Danapur division of the East Central Railway zone of the Indian Railways. Patna Junction is one of the busiest railway stations of the country.

Patna Junction railway station is connected to most of the major cities in India by the railway network. Patna lies in between New Delhi and Kolkata which is one of the busiest rail routes in India. Patna has trains running frequently to Delhi and Kolkata. The city is a major railway hub and has five major stations: Patna Junction, Rajendranagar Terminal, Danapur railway station,  and Patna Sahib station. Also 2 major railway station: Hajipur Junction and Sonpur Junction are just at a distance of 20 km from Patna. Patna is well connected with Ara, Gaya, Jehanabad, Biharsharif, Rajgir, Islampur, Sonpur, Hajipur, Muzaffarpur, Chhapra through daily passenger and express train services.

History

Patna Junction railway station was opened in 1862 as Bankipore Junction in Bankipore (Bankipur) town, headquarters of the division and Patna district in Bengal, British India. The construction of railway line through Patna was started in 1855 and was completed and opened in 1862. Prior to that the transport of raw materials and finished goods was done through the Ganga river. The Danapur Division came into existence on 1 January 1925. The present Divisional Railway Managers' office building was built in 1929.

In 1948 Eastern Railway (ER) started an exclusively third class express train known as 'Janta Express' on 1 October 1948. This initially ran between Patna and Delhi and later on was extended from Delhi up to Howrah in 1949.  This was the first Janta Express train in India.

In 2002 extensive redevelopment took place. The number of platform was increased from 7 to 10. A new floor was constructed in the main station building. The platforms are interconnected with three foot overbridges (FOB). The western overbridge is called the Delhi end FOB and the easternmost FOB is called Kolkata end FOB.

At the Rajendra Nagar Terminal and Patna Junction route relay interlocking (RRI) system were installed between 7 February 2012 till 12 February. The presence of RRI system allows computer operated change of tracks for running trains. The presence of RRT system improves the safety of the railway traffic in the region.

The new station façade put up in 2018-19 was designed by National Institute of Technology, Patna. There have been other efforts as well to add cultural depictions and artwork in the station.

Facilities
Facilities include mechanised cleaning, free RO mineral water, waiting rooms, retiring rooms, refreshment rooms for both vegetarians and non-vegetarians, food and tea stalls, book stalls, vehicle parking etc. It has a computerised reservation facility. Vehicles are allowed to enter the station premises. During the COVID-19 pandemic, an automated Mask and Sanitizer Dispenser (MSD) machine was installed. There is a post and telegraphic office and Government Railway Police (GRP) office. Patna Junction is located close to the bus terminal and domestic airport providing transport to important destinations of Bihar. There is second exit point from Karbigahiya end of the Patna Junction. Karbigahiya is located on the south side of Patna Junction and serves as direct access point for platforms of the railway station.

To modernise the train inquiry system a call centre was opened in 2005. Automatic ticket vending machines have been installed to reduce the queue for train tickets on the station. One of the two departmental catering units of Danapur division are located at Patna Junction, the other being at Kiul Junction. Patna Junction is going to have a metro station under Patna Metro. There are a number of escalators.

Indian Railways, under its station redevelopment and beautification initiative, renovated and beautified the waiting hall which opened in 2019. It has been set up over an area of 7500 sq ft, providing seating capacity for over 300 passengers. Additionally 200 more seats are planned. The newly opened waiting hall is said to be largest waiting hall in the Indian Railways network. The new waiting hall has been provided with 7 HD screens of 65" displaying entertainment related content as well as train information 24*7. The walls of the waiting hall has been beautified to promote local art with all the walls being covered in Madhubani painting with bright and attractive colours. For the convenience of the passengers the entire waiting hall has been centrally air-conditioned. The waiting hall has also been provided with additional fans and lighted with 100 percent LED fixtures concealed in the ceiling. The station has lactation room for mothers so that the lactating mothers will be able to comfortably feed their babies in privacy. The railway station has already been fitted with high-speed wireless internet service for passengers to enjoy free Wi-Fi facility. It was the first station in India to try out linen kiosks. Indian Railways is soon going to construct Suburban Rail Terminal at Hardinge Park which is  barely 900 metres west from Patna Junction.

Rail traffic
Patna Junction railway station is a major station of the East Central Railways. Its location on the Delhi–Kolkata rail route, makes Patna Junction served by several Express and Superfast trains.

In 2009, the construction of Digha–Sonpur Bridge, was underway on the banks on the Ganges nearby, connected Patna to Pahleja Ghat.  The railway part of bridge was opened to rail traffic from 3 February 2016 and railway started passenger service from Patliputra Junction to various railway stations on north side of Ganges in Bihar.

Gallery

Nearest airports
The nearest airports to Patna Junction are:

Lok Nayak Jayaprakash Airport, Patna 
Gaya Airport 
Darbhanga Airport

In popular culture
 Patna Junction will be among the filming locations for the Bollywood movie Half Girlfriend.

See also
 Patna Metro

References

External links

 Patna Junction Map
 Official website of the Patna district

Danapur railway division
Railway stations in Patna
Railway stations opened in 1862
1862 establishments in India
Railway junction stations in Bihar
Indian Railway A1 Category Stations